Oriental Adventures (abbreviated OA) is the title shared by two hardback rulebooks published for different versions of the Dungeons & Dragons (D&D) fantasy roleplaying game.  Each version of Oriental Adventures provides rules for adapting its respective version of D&D for use in campaign settings based on the Far East, rather than the medieval Europe-setting assumed by most D&D books.  Both versions of Oriental Adventures include example campaign settings.

Advanced Dungeons & Dragons
The original Oriental Adventures was written by Gary Gygax, David "Zeb" Cook, and François Marcela-Froideval, and published in 1985 by TSR, Inc. as a 144-page hardcover for use with the Advanced Dungeons & Dragons (AD&D) 1st edition rules. The book was edited by Steve Winter, Mike Breault, Anne Gray, and Thad Russell. The book's cover art was by Jeff Easley, with interior illustrations by Roger Raupp, James Holloway, Easley, and Dave Sutherland.

In 1999, a paperback reprint of the first edition was released.

Campaign features
The book provides rules for ten character classes and three races to be used in place of standard AD&D classes and races. The book presents new versions of the barbarian (here a steppe warrior or forest and jungle dweller) and monk, as well as new classes such as the ninja, kensai, wu-jen, and shukenja.

Kensai "seek to perfect their weapons technique to the exclusion of all else. They are deadly in combat, but cannot use magical weaponry because it detracts from the appreciation of their skill". Wu-jen are magic-users who must obey their personal taboos to avoid losing all spell powers. Shukenja are clerics who become penalized if they kill enemies too freely. A ninja character must take one of the other classes as well as the ninja class. In keeping with their secret nature, ninja use their normal class as a cover identity; a ninja must be careful to keep his identity secret, as loss of honor (and sudden death) may occur if the PC is unmasked. The other classes introduced in the book are the sohei, the bushi (peasant warriors), the samurai, and the yakuza. The three new character races are the korobokuru (equivalent to dwarves, without the bad temper and greediness), the hengeyokai (intelligent animals who can shape-change into human form), and the spirit folk (humanoids whose life force is tied to a particular location).  The book draws on the history of China, Korea, and Japan, and includes information on families, clans, caste, and honor.

The original Oriental Adventures introduced two major innovations to the AD&D system. Although previous TSR publications, such as Deities & Demigods, had touched on using non-European settings for the game, Oriental Adventures was the first official supplement devoted entirely to roleplaying in a non-Western setting.  Oriental Adventures also introduced a new game mechanic to Dungeons & Dragons; it was the first official supplement to include rules for non-weapon proficiencies. Every character is expected to possess proficiencies in the noncombat arts with skills such as calligraphy, etiquette, animal handling, iaijutsu (fast draw), and bowyer. Both non-weapon proficiencies and non-European settings were explored in more detail in the 2nd edition AD&D rules.

The book includes an honor system, in which honor points are lost when a character fails to behave in a correct fashion or uphold the family name; eventually the character sheet is simply thrown away, if such behavior continues. Personal honor is also reflected in the honor of a character's family. The character's family background is also determined by a system which generates a character's immediate family and ancestors, determines family honor and status, and also provides characters with their birthrights.

Also included are detailed rules for karate and other martial arts styles. These rules allow the Dungeon Master to construct new martial arts styles and techniques by choosing from a range of menu options. All characters may study martial arts, provided they can find masters to teach them; monks and shukenja start their adventuring lives with some martial arts training. Each character class also has its own unique ki powers, which become more effective as characters advance through each level.

The original Oriental Adventures includes a long background section on the fantasy setting known as Kara-Tur. Kara-Tur was later made a continent of Abeir-Toril. TSR went on to produce eight adventure modules using the Oriental Adventures rules and the Kara-Tur setting.

Gary Gygax intended to incorporate the material from Oriental Adventures into revised versions of the Players Handbook and Dungeon Masters Guide, but left TSR shortly after announcing the project. Oriental Adventures was TSR's biggest seller in 1985. Little, if any, material from Oriental Adventures was incorporated into the AD&D 2nd Edition core books, and Oriental Adventures itself was never revised for a 2nd Edition.

Reception
Ashley Shepherd reviewed Oriental Adventures for issue No. 74 of White Dwarf magazine, giving it an overall rating of 9 out of 10. Shepherd felt that the book was not so much a sourcebook but "a completely new version of AD&D. "The old stand-bys of the AD&D system are still in the rules, but the elements have been intelligently modified to produce something that is far greater than the sum of its parts." Sheperd felt that the character classes each had a twist which made them interesting and worth playing. Sheperd noted that the monk was in its proper Eastern context, and that the ninja was the best version the reviewer had seen.

Shepherd stated that the skill system of "proficiency slots" was a "sensible extension of the character rules, and should be extended to cover the whole system, not just this Eastern supplement".  Shepherd also felt that the honor system was a good touch, and that the real strength of the new martial arts system was that the Dungeon Master was now able to construct any number of new styles. Shepherd compared the sourcebook favorably with Bushido, another oriental role-playing game of the time, feeling that Oriental Adventures was a better choice as a game system. Shepherd concluded the review by saying, "By remaining compatible with the rest of AD&D, Dave Cook has written an excellent set of rules which should be very popular. Oriental Adventures has even persuaded me to start playing AD&D again."

Jim Bambra reviewed Oriental Adventures for Dragon magazine #134, June 1988. Bambra felt that with Oriental Adventures, the AD&D game made the transition to the Orient "with style", complete with new character classes and spells that "admirably capture the flavor of the Orient, and the inclusion of nonhuman character types". Bambra felt that the book's martial artist system "really shines", as it "gives practitioners a wide range from which to choose and adds a very interesting dimension to combat". He concluded that "Oriental Adventures is solidly Oriental in feel and is an excellent addition to the AD&D game."

Reviews
 Casus Belli #30 (Jan 1986)
Isaac Asimov's Science Fiction Magazine v10 n11 (1986 11)

Other releases
TSR released several products with the Oriental Adventures logo . This includes a series of modules numbered OA1 to OA7, the first five of which (Swords of the Daimyo, Night of the Seven Swords, Ochimo: The Spirit Warrior, Blood of the Yakuza, and Mad Monkey vs. the Dragon Claw) were released for first edition AD&D. The sixth module (Ronin Challenge) was released for the second edition, as was the seventh module (Test of the Samurai) which did not have the Oriental Adventures logo. The last three of these modules also had the Forgotten Realms logo. The Kara-Tur: The Eastern Realms boxed set, also for Forgotten Realms, was billed as an expansion for Oriental Adventures. Also released for second edition was a volume for the Monstrous Compendium series.

Dungeons & Dragons 3rd edition

The second version of Oriental Adventures was written by James Wyatt and published by Wizards of the Coast in October 2001. The cover art is by Raven Mimura, with interior art by: Matt Cavotta, Larry Dixon, Cris Dornaus, David Martin, Raven Mimura, Wayne Reynolds, Darrell Riche, Richard Sardinha, Brian Snoddy, and Arnie Swekel. It uses the D&D 3rd Edition rules.

An official (but not 100% comprehensive) update of Oriental Adventures to the v.3.5 rules can be found in Dragon Magazine #318 (April 2004), pp. 32–48.

Campaign features
The book includes: seven playable new races, including nezumi, vanara, and three different types of spirit folk; five new base classes, including the samurai, sohei, and shugenja; 17 new prestige classes; over one hundred new spells; and seventy-five new monsters, over a dozen of which (including five types of Naga) were given level adjustments for adapting them into playable races. The featured campaign setting of this edition is Rokugan, a campaign setting originally created for the game Legend of the Five Rings.

Reception
The reviewer from Pyramid noted that while the first edition book was a 144-page black and white text, the third edition book was 256 pages and full color.

The second Oriental Adventures won the 2002 Ennie Award for "Best Campaign Setting".

Dungeons & Dragons 4th edition
Wizards of the Coast did not release a new edition of Oriental Adventures for 4th edition. A number of the monsters from the Oriental Adventures setting, such as the oni, were included in the Monster Manual. The shaman is in the Player's Handbook 2 as a leader based on the primal power source. The monk appears in Player's Handbook 3.

As of Dragon Issue 404 (October 2011), samurai and sohei were added as character themes. The ninja is a build for the assassin class.

References

Further reading
"...And a Step Beyond That", Dragon #122
"A Menagerie of Martial Arts", Dragon #127
"A Step Beyond Shogun...", Dragon #122
"Flying Feet and Lightning Hands", Dragon #164
"Hand-to-Hand Against the Rules", Dragon #139
"New Kicks in Martial Arts", Dragon #136
"Sage Advice", Dragon #121
"Sage Advice", Dragon #122
"Sage Advice", Dragon #151
"Taking the Mystery Out of the Orient: Updates and Errata for Oriental Adventures", Footprints #9
"Things Your Sensei Never Taught You", Dragon #164

External links
 Kohler, Alan D.  Oriental Adventures capsule review, retrieved June 1, 2006
http://www.rpg.net/news+reviews/reviews/rev_7441.html

1985 books
2001 books
Books by Gary Gygax
Dungeons & Dragons campaign settings
Dungeons & Dragons sourcebooks
ENnies winners
Role-playing game supplements introduced in 1985